Aenea may refer to:

Aenea (city), a city of ancient Greece

Biology
Lamprima aenea, a species of beetle in the family Lucanidae
Nebria aenea aenea, a subspecies of ground beetle in the subfamily Nebriinae

Other uses
Aenea, a character in the Hyperion Cantos by Dan Simmons

See also
Anaea (disambiguation)
Aeneas (disambiguation)